Mudaria fisherae is a moth of the family Noctuidae first described by Prout in 1928. It is found in Sri Lanka.

References

Moths of Asia
Moths described in 1928
Hadeninae